
 

Evangelina and Evangeline are feminine given names, diminutives of Latin "evangelium" ("gospel", itself from Greek Ευαγγέλιο "gospel", meaning "good news").

People with these names include:

Evangelina
Evangelina Carrozzo, Argentine model, dancer, and beauty queen
Evangelina Cosio y Cisneros, Cuban rebel
Evangelina Elizondo, Mexican actress
Evangelina Guerrero Zacarías, Filipina poet
Evangelina Oyo Ebule, Equatorial Guinean politician
Evangelina Salazar, Argentine actress
Evangelina Sobredo Galanes, known as Cecilia, Spanish singer and songwriter
Evangelina Villegas, Mexican biochemist
Evangelina Vigil-Piñón, poet

Evangeline
Evangeline (singer), Australian singer/songwriter signed to Razor Recordings
Evangeline Anderson Rajkumar, American theologian
Evangeline Booth, British evangelist
Evangeline Bruce, American writer
Evangeline Lilly, Canadian actress
Evangeline Marrs Whipple, American theologian
Evangeline Walton (1907–1996), American author
Evangeline Barongo, Ugandan author of children's literature
Evangeline Edwards (1888-1957), The first female professor of Chinese anywhere in the Western world
Evangeline Atwood (1906-1987), American historian, activist, and philanthropist.
Evangeline Russell, American actress known for her work in silent Westerns
Julia Evangeline Brooks, Incorporator of Alpha Kappa Alpha Sorority, Incorporated, the first sorority founded by African-American women
Evangeline Lydia Emsley, Canadian (WW1) nurse

See also
Evangeline (disambiguation)

References

Feminine given names